Valery Stepanovich Sakhashchyk is a former commander of the Belarusian 38th Separate Guards Air Assault Brigade. Following the 24 February 2022 full-scale Russian invasion of Ukraine, Sakhashchyk launched video appeals calling for Belarusian forces to refuse to participate in any attack against Ukraine. On 9 August 2022, he was nominated as the effective defence minister of the Belarusian United Transitional Cabinet, a government-in-exile opposed to the de facto government of Alexander Lukashenko.

Childhood and education
He and his family moved to Drahichyn when he started school. Sakhashchyk was an avid reader of adventure books involving travel and military conflict, motivating him to aim at a air force career.

Sakhashchyk studied at Moscow Higher Military Command School. He graduated with a gold medal.

Soviet military career
Sakhashchyk's military career started by commanding a company in Zabaykalsky Krai. In the 1980s, he commanded a company in Perleberg, East Germany.

In 1992, he returned to Brest, where he was appointed Deputy Commander of the 2nd Paratrooper Battalion of the 38th Separate Guards Air Assault Brigade of newly independent Belarus, and promoted to Combatant after six months. In 1995, Sakhashchyk studied at the Military Academy of Belarus, after which he returned to the 38th Brigade as Deputy Brigade Commander, and then Brigade Commander.

Sakhashchyk resigned from his post in 2002, in response to what he described as "palace intrigues" in relation to reorganisation of the Belarusian armed forces.

Construction
In 2007 Sakhashchyk started a family-owned construction business in Belarus, Poland and Germany, SK-BUD & Sahaty.

Opposition

2020–2021 Belarusian protests
Sakhashchyk participated in the 2020–2021 Belarusian protests that followed the disputed 2020 Belarusian presidential election. He was seen in a protest in Brest on 16 August 2020, organising a group of 38th Brigade members that aimed to prevent confrontations between protestors and police from becoming violent. Sakhashchyk stated that he believed at the time that a legal approach within the Belarusian Constitution should have allowed citizens to defend their rights.

After the full-scale Russian invasion of Ukraine started on 24 February 2022, Sakhashchyk published a video appeal calling for Belarusians to refuse to participate in the invasion. He argued that there were three reasons for refusing to participate: Ukraine had never threatened Belarus; the Ukrainian government was freely elected and not constituted of drug addicts or far-right nationalists; it would be illegal under the Belarusian Constitution for Belarusian forces to enter Ukraine. He stated in mid-March that no junior officers, sergeants or lower-ranked Belarusian soldiers wanted to fight in Ukraine.

In mid-March 2022, Sakhashchyk complemented the Ukrainian armed forces and territorial defence, stating that they had "exceeded all expectations".

United Transitional Cabinet
At a meeting of the Belarusian opposition in Berlin in July 2022, former military commander Vadim Prokopyev proposed that Sviatlana Tsikhanouskaya, the apparent winner of the 2020 presidential election and leader-in-exile of the Belarusian opposition, should play the role of British Queen Elizabeth and that a "Winston Churchill, head of the military cabinet" was needed in the role of prime minister. The name of Sakhashchyk emerged in the discussion and on 9 August 2022 he was appointed as the member for defence and security in the Belarusian United Transitional Cabinet, aimed at replacing the de facto Lukashenko government. BBC News referred to Sakhashchyk as "effectively the defence minister ... of the Belarusian opposition-in-exile".

Sakhashchyk stated that he saw his role in the Cabinet as being within a parliamentary republic with a separation of powers and checks and balances. He said that military resources included the Kastuś Kalinoŭski Regiment and "intelligence, surveillance and communications systems". He said that he hoped that a show of force would be enough to achieve a non-violent unity in Belarus by dialogue and that he would do his best to avoid a civil war scenario in Belarus. Friedrich Ebert Foundation'' researchers described Sakhashchyk's role as "train[ing] Belarusian combat units abroad", as a complement to Cabinet member Aliaksandr Azarau's role in training volunteers for "special operations".

In October 2022, Sakhashchyk published another video appeal, again calling for Belarusian armed forces to refuse to participate in a speculated attack on Ukraine. He asked if Belarusian forces would prefer to remain "highly respected members of society" rather than become criminals prosecuted in the International Criminal Court investigation in Ukraine. He expressed his worry that Belarusian casualties would lead to "decades" of enmity between Belarusians and Ukrainians.

References

Living people
Belarusian politicians
Belarusian military personnel
Year of birth missing (living people)